Alexander "Al" Kvasnak (January 11, 1921 – September 26, 2002) was a Major League Baseball outfielder who played for the Washington Senators in .

External links

1921 births
2002 deaths
Washington Senators (1901–1960) players
Baseball players from Pennsylvania
Newport Canners players